Wick Golf Club was established in 1870, making it the oldest established golf club in the Highlands of Scotland. Located in Caithness, 3 miles north of the town of Wick, it is one of the most northerly courses in mainland UK.

The course is a traditional 18 hole link layout consisting 9 holes out and 9 back to the clubhouse.

References

Golf clubs and courses in Highland (council area)
1870 establishments in Scotland
Buildings and structures in Caithness
Sport in Caithness